Robert M. Stevens is a cinematographer and occasional actor. Mostly being involved in comedy films, his credits include:

The Toy (1982)
Earth Star Voyager (1988)
The Naked Gun: From the Files of Police Squad! (1988)
The 'Burbs (1989)
Fear (1990)
Delirious (1991)
The Naked Gun 2½: The Smell of Fear (1991)
Beyond the Law (1992)
Naked Gun : The Final Insult (1994)
Serial Mom (1994)
The Man Who Knew Too Little (1997)
Breast Men (1997)
Pecker (1998)
Simply Irresistible (1999)
Cecil B. Demented (2000)
Dude, Where's My Car? (2000)
Kickin' It Old Skool (2007)

Stevens is a member of the American Society of Cinematographers.

References

External links

American cinematographers
Living people
Place of birth missing (living people)
Year of birth missing (living people)